KVSW-LP was a low-power television station serving Winslow, Arizona, which broadcast locally in analog on UHF channel 38 as an affiliate of America One Television Network. The station was owned by Village Broadcasting Corp., a subsidiary of Longfoot Communications Corp. of Los Angeles, California and was the first television station owned by Longfoot Communications to be licensed. The station ceased operations November 28, 2007, and the owners surrendered its license to the FCC.

History
An original construction permit to build a low power television station was granted to Dean M. Mosely of US Interactive LLC on February 9, 2004.  The station was to broadcast on analog channel 38 and was assigned the call letters K38IH. At the time, US Interactive was experimenting with a means of providing wireless Internet service over UHF television frequencies. The plan never materialized and in January 2006, US Interactive sold the permit to Village Broadcasting Corp., who changed the call letters to KVSW-LP in April 2006. The station began operations under Program Test Authority on July 10, 2006, received its original license nine days later, and became an affiliate of America One. It ceased operations after less than seventeen months on the air.

References

External links

VSW-LP
Winslow, Arizona
Mass media in Navajo County, Arizona
Defunct television stations in the United States
Television channels and stations established in 2004
Television channels and stations disestablished in 2007
2004 establishments in Arizona
2007 disestablishments in Arizona
VSW-LP